Westside Park is located in Chehalis, Washington in the city's Pennsylvania Avenue-West Side Historic District, catalogued on the National Register of Historic Places in 1991.

The  park contains basketball courts, a playground, and picnic areas. It is known locally for its blossoming cherry trees, first planted in 1932, and towering conifers.

The park began in 1907 and the area became a playground and recreation area for the West Side School. Due to damages from the 1949 Olympia earthquake, the school was razed and the park became public.

In 2021, a volunteer neighborhood group, the Friends of Westside Park, organized to oversee improvements to the park. That same year, the group, in collaboration with the Chehalis Foundation, were able to receive a $20,000 earmark for the park from the Chehalis City Council as a beginning funding effort for future renovations.

See also
Parks and Recreation in Chehalis, Washington

References

Parks in Lewis County, Washington
Chehalis, Washington